Sejerø is a Danish island in the Kattegat sea, north-west of Zealand.
The largest village on Sejerø is Sejerby, housing half of the island's population.

South-east of Sejerø is the smaller island of Nekselø, also in the Bay of Sejerø.

See also
Nearby islands:

 Nekselø
 Samsø
 Zealand

References

Sources 
 Tageo.com, "VESTSJAELLAND DENMARK Geography Population" (coordinates), 2007, webpage: Tageo-Sejero.
 Denmark Postal codes, webpage: Postnumre-DK.
 Tele.dk Denmark detailed road map, webpage: Tele-DK-Danmark.

Islands of Denmark
Danish islands in Kattegat
Geography of Kalundborg Municipality